This is a list of notable individuals born in Guatemala of Lebanese ancestry or people of Lebanese and Guatemalan dual nationality who live or lived in Guatemala.

Politicians
 Jorge Briz Abularach - politician
 Jorge Serrano Elías - former president of Guatemala

See also
 Lebanese diaspora
 List of Lebanese people
 List of Lebanese people (Diaspora)

References

Guatemala
Lebanese
Lebanese